Corbin is an unincorporated community and ghost town in Jefferson County, Montana, United States, approximately  west of Jefferson City and accessible from the Interstate 15 Jefferson City interchange and following Corbin Road. Corbin is part of the Helena micropolitan area.

History
Corbin was in important mining town in the 1890s and included a stamp mill and heavy infrastructure for the time which yielded decent amounts of gold and silver. Alta Mine in particular, was a major silver mine in the area which the town developed around. A post office was active in Corbin from 1887 until 1943.

Today the Alta mine is no longer in operation and Corbin is a ghost town, but many of the historic structures still stand today with some having been preserved and some residences are currently occupied. Much gold and silver mining continues in the area, but Corbin itself has peaked and declined.

References

Unincorporated communities in Jefferson County, Montana
Ghost towns in Montana
Unincorporated communities in Montana